Durosinmi is a surname. Notable people with the surname include:

 Adefolarin Durosinmi (born 1991), Nigerian footballer
 Dr. Lateefah Durosinmi (born 1957), Nigerian chemist and academic
 Omoba Yinka Durosinmi (born 1961), Nigerian politician

Surnames of Nigerian origin